The 2008 New Zealand Grand Prix was an open wheel racing car race held at Manfeild Autocourse, near Feilding on 13 January 2008.

It was the fifty third New Zealand Grand Prix and was open to Toyota Racing Series cars (based on international Formula 3 regulations). The event was also the third race of the third round of the 2007–08 Toyota Racing Series.

Classification

Qualifying

Grand Prix

References

External links
 Toyota Racing Series

New Zealand Grand Prix
Grand Prix
Toyota Racing Series